Rameshwarlall Daulatram Nopany also known as R. L. Nopany (1902 -1970) was a sugar-mill owner and businessman based in Calcutta, India.

Career

Nopany Group
He was son of Seth Daulatram Nopany, who are originally from Mahansar in Rajasthan. He along with his elder brother Rawatmull Daulatram Nopany founded the Nopany Group of Industries in decade of 1930. He completed his education from Scottish Church College of Calcutta.

The firm Messrs. Daulatram Rawatmull & Daulatram Rameshwarlall owned several sugar mills like Shree Hanuman Sugar Mills at Motihari, Mewar Sugar Mills at Bhupalsagar, Rajasthan, North Behar Sugar Mills at Naraipur, Bihar, Belsund Sugar Co at Riga, Bihar. The group also holds Nopany Investments.

Chandra Shekhar Nonapy, the great grandson of Rawatmull ( brother of Rameshwarlall Daulatram Nopany & co-founder of Nopany group), who is son of Bimal Kumar Nopany & Nandini Nopany (daughter of Krishna Kumar Birla), now controls most of Nopany Group and a  major part of K K Birla group.

Other organisational affiliations
Furthermore, he was a director in United Commercial Bank, Hindusthan Mercantile Bank, Ruby General Insurance Co,  Mahabir Collieries Ltd., New Huntodih Coal Co, The headquarter of Nopany group remained in Calcutta with branches in various state including a office in Bombay. 

He served as the President of Indian Sugar Mills Association (1940–41), Bihar Sugar Mills Association, Indian Chamber of Commerce  (1942–43), Indian Hemp Association (1941-43), & Treasurer, Federation of Indian Chambers of Commerce & Industry (1933–34).

He was also a member of Indian Central Sugarcane Committee and Indian Central Oil-seeds Committee of Government of India.

Schools
The Nopany Group also founded many schools across India among which Shri Daulatram Nopany Vidyalaya, a High School at Kolkata is a premier institute run by family.Nopany Girls School, Pretoria High School, Ganges Gurukul and at the college level, Nopany Institute of Management Studies all in Kolkata. Other schools founded by them are North Bihar Sugar Mills High School at Narainpur in Bihar, Seth Daulatram Nopany Vidyabhawan, Mahansar.

References

1902 births
1970 deaths
Businesspeople in the sugar industry
People from Kolkata
People from Jhunjhunu district
Founders of Indian schools and colleges
Indian businesspeople in coal
Indian bankers
Indian philanthropists
Scottish Church College alumni